The Convent of Nuestra Señora del Rosario y Santo Domingo (Spanish: Convento de Nuestra Señora del Rosario y Santo Domingo) is a convent located in Cádiz, Spain. It was declared Bien de Interés Cultural in 2005.

See also 
 List of Bien de Interés Cultural in the Province of Cádiz

References 

Bien de Interés Cultural landmarks in the Province of Cádiz
Convents in Spain